Lee Giffin (born April 1, 1967) is a professional ice hockey player who played 27 games in the National Hockey League.  He played with the Pittsburgh Penguins.

Career statistics

References

External links 

1967 births
Living people
Canadian ice hockey right wingers
Ice hockey people from Ontario
Pittsburgh Penguins players
Pittsburgh Penguins draft picks
Sportspeople from Chatham-Kent